was a Japanese kugyō (court noble) of the Kamakura period.  He was a member of the Nijō family, which was a branch of the Fujiwara clan.

Early life
Morotada was the son of regent Nijō Yoshizane.

Career
During the reign of Emperor Fushimi, he was kampaku from 1287 to 1289.

He adopted Nijō Kanemoto as his son.

See also
 Japanese clans
 List of Kuge families

References

External links
 二条家（摂家）at ReichsArchiv.jp

1254 births
1341 deaths
Fujiwara clan
Morotada
People of Kamakura-period Japan
People of Nanboku-chō-period Japan